Cosmic crystallography is a technique used in physics and astronomy to determine the possible topology of the universe (e.g. a torus, 3-sphere, etc.).  Astronomers observe sources of high redshift and look for repeating patterns that may indicate the connection of edges.

Pair separation histograms
Cosmic crystallographers use cosmic separation histograms to infer characteristics of the universe. Large spikes are expected to appear if the universe is not simply connected.

References

Physical cosmology